Jason Murrietta (born September 9, 1984) is a former American football quarterback. He was signed by the Spokane Shock as an undrafted free agent in 2008. He played college football at Northern Arizona University and was named the Big Sky Offensive Player of the Year in 2006.

References

External links
Arena Football League bio

1984 births
Living people
American football quarterbacks
Northern Arizona Lumberjacks football players
Rock River Raptors players
Spokane Shock players
Central Valley Coyotes players
Arizona Rattlers players